The Ayanami class was a destroyer class built for the Japan Maritime Self-Defense Force (JMSDF) in the late 1950s. The primary purpose was anti-submarine warfare, so this class was classified as "DDK" (hunter-killer anti-submarine destroyer) unofficially.

Design
This class adopted a "long forecastle" design with inclined afterdeck called "Holland Slope", named after the scenic sloping street in Nagasaki City.

The Ayanami class were the first JMSDF vessels equipped with six 3-inch/50 caliber Mark 22 guns with Mark 33 dual mounts and Mark 32 lightweight torpedoes with two Mark 2 over-the-side launchers. 3-inch guns were controlled by two Mark 63 GFCSs.

All seven vessels names had previously been borne by ships of the World War II-era  and  classes.

Notes

References

 

 
Destroyer classes